Lady Grey may refer to:

People
 Lady Jane Grey (c. 1530–1554), claimant to the Kingdom of England and Ireland who was known for the briefness of her reign over both (9 days)
 Lady Mary Grey (1545–1578), younger sister of Lady Jane Grey, the third and youngest daughter of Henry Grey, 1st Duke of Suffolk and Lady Frances Brandon
 Lady Katherine Grey (1540–1568), younger sister of Lady Jane Grey and a cousin of Elizabeth I of England
 Lady Eliza Lucy Grey (1823–1898), daughter of Captain Sir Richard Spencer and the wife of Sir George Grey
 Anne Brandon, Baroness Grey of Powys (c. 1507–1558) 
 Lady Grey, president of the Girls' Friendly Society 1883–1889, wife of Admiral Sir Frederick Grey, born Barbarina Charlotte Sullivan 
 Lady Grey, any female holder of the title Baron Grey of Ruthin
 Lady Grey, any wife of a holder of the title Earl Grey
 Lady Grey, any wife of a holder of the title Baron Grey

Arts and entertainment
 Lady Grey, 1980 movie starring Ginger Alden
 Lady Grey (comics), a fictional character in Marvel Comics
 Lady Grey, a fictional evil temptress and mayor in the video game Fable

Other uses
 Lady Grey (tea), a blend of tea by Twinings
 Lady Grey, Eastern Cape, a small town in the Eastern Cape of South Africa
 Lady Grey Elementary School, a school in British Columbia

See also
 Lord Grey (disambiguation)